Cairns Tropical Pride was an annual LGBT pride parade and festival in Cairns, Australia, and the largest LGBT event in Tropical North Queensland. The first event was held in 2006, and was originally held in conjunction with the Cairns Festival before changing its name for 2015 and 2016 to "Tropical Mardi Gras" and its timing to October. The event reverted to Cairns Tropical Pride for 2017.

The festival featured a variety of activities, including boat cruises, pool parties, art exhibitions and a Fair Day with a renowned Dog Show, community forums, drag and fashion shows, art exhibition and community recognition awards. In 2016, the Fair Day also introduced an annual same-sex wedding expo.

In 2019, the organization's board voted to discontinue the festival due to a lack of support, funds, and volunteers.

See also

LGBT rights in Australia
List of LGBT events

References

2006 establishments in Australia
Pride parades in Australia
Recurring events established in 2006
Mardi Gras
Carnivals in Australia